Thomas Reardon Porell (born September 23, 1964) is a former American football nose tackle who played in one game for the New England Patriots of the National Football League (NFL) in 1987. Porell also was with the Atlanta Falcons and Green Bay Packers, but did not play with them. Porell later became defensive coordinator at Providence College and is now a youth football coach.

References

1964 births
Living people
Sportspeople from Cambridge, Massachusetts
Players of American football from Massachusetts
New England Patriots players
American football defensive tackles
Boston College Eagles football players
National Football League replacement players